The C.W. Bill Jones Pumping Plant (formerly the Tracy Pumping Plant) located 9 miles northwest of Tracy, CA, was constructed between 1947 and
1951, and is a key component of the Central Valley Project.
The Delta Cross Channel intercepts Sacramento River water as it travels westwards towards Suisun Bay and diverts it south through a series of man-made channels, the Mokelumne River, and other natural sloughs, marshes and distributaries. From there, the water travels to the C.W. Bill Jones Pumping Plant, which raises water into the Delta-Mendota Canal, which in turn travels  southwards to Mendota Pool on the San Joaquin River, supplying water to other CVP reservoirs about midway. The Tracy Fish Collection Facility exists at the entrance of the pump plant in order to catch fish that would otherwise end up in the Delta-Mendota Canal.

The Jones Pumping Plant provides water service to 32 water districts within the western San Joaquin Valley, San Benito and Santa Clara counties.

Specifications
 pumps: six 22,500 HP electric motors 
 normal lift: 197 feet

References

External links
 CDEC daily sensor data

Central Valley Project
Buildings and structures in Contra Costa County, California
Water supply infrastructure in California
Water supply pumping stations in the United States
Sacramento–San Joaquin River Delta